Thinopyrum elongatum, the tall wheatgrass, is a species of perennial herb in the family Poaceae (true grasses). They have a self-supporting growth form and simple, broad leaves and yellow flowers. Individuals can grow to 5 feet tall.

Source

References 

elongatum